Susan Ruiz is an American politician, who was elected to the Kansas House of Representatives in the 2018 elections. She represents the 23rd House District as a member of the Democratic Party.

Openly lesbian, she was elected alongside Brandon Woodard as the state's first-ever LGBT state legislators.

2019-2020 Kansas House of Representatives Committee Assignments
Social Services Budget
Veterans and Military
Children and Seniors

References

External links

Living people
Democratic Party members of the Kansas House of Representatives
LGBT state legislators in Kansas
Women state legislators in Kansas
Lesbian politicians
LGBT Hispanic and Latino American people
Hispanic and Latino American state legislators
21st-century American politicians
People from Shawnee, Kansas
Year of birth missing (living people)
21st-century American women politicians